Heavy Liquid is a five-issue limited series written by Paul Pope which has science fiction and cyberpunk elements.

Plot
A former police officer known only as "S" operates as a private detective based in New York City, finding people and objects for a fee.  S steals a quantity of a strange substance called "Heavy Liquid". On its own, it is a metallic-liquid explosive, but it turns into "black milk" when cooked, and exhibits mind-altering, drug-like properties. A mysterious art collector who also has a quantity of Heavy Liquid wishes to hire S to find a missing artist named Rodan Esperella (coincidentally S's ex-lover), whom he hopes will create a piece out of the Heavy Liquid for him. In the meantime, assassins are on S's trail, looking to retrieve the stolen Heavy Liquid. S finally trails Esperella to Paris, and he tries to broker a deal between her and the art collector. Esperella promises to sculpt a masterpiece on the condition that she never see S again. His job done, S boards a train heading to Prague, where he is cornered by one of his pursuers. S then discovers from his pursuer that the Heavy Liquid is alien in origin, and may even possess some form of consciousness. Ingesting the drug himself, S escapes by jumping onto another train, his physical abilities dramatically increased by the Heavy Liquid. S comes to understand its nature as a medium containing an alien intelligence. Ultimately, on the European train, S experiences first contact with the being.

Collected editions
The full series was collected in a single hardcover from DC Comics.

A second collection of the five original issues was collected by Image Comics in 2019.

References